The Vedanta Kesari (The Lion of Vedanta) (formerly Brahmavadin) is an English language monthly magazine covering spiritual and cultural issues, published by the Ramakrishna Math in Chennai, India, since 1895.

History
Under the inspiration of Swami Vivekananda, a group of his disciples in Madras, which included G. Venkataranga Rao, M.C. Nanjunda Rao and Alasinga Perumal, started on 14 September 1895 a monthly journal bearing the title Brahmavadin.

One of Swamiji's letters to Alasinga read: "I learnt from your letters the bad financial state that Brahmavadin is in." Swamiji repeatedly said, "The Brahmavadin is a jewel-it must not perish!". It continued to be brought out regularly for 14 years, until Alasinga's demise in 1909. From 1909 to 1914, the publication of Brahmavadin became quite irregular. The last issue was brought out in 1914 (March–April). 

Soon after, the Brahmavadin'''s legacy was continued by a new journal, The Vedanta Kesari, started by Sri Ramakrishna Math Chennai, and has been in circulation ever since.

CirculationThe Vedanta Kesari is one of India's oldest English language religious magazines, having been published for 106 years as of 2019. It has a monthly circulation of over 12,000 copies, of which over 2000 go to public and institutional libraries across India. The magazine has subscribers in 27 countries.

 Contents The Vedanta Kesari contains articles on Indian spiritual traditions and scriptures, focusing on the philosophy of Vedanta as expounded by Swami Vivekananda, the disciple of Ramakrishna, a nineteenth century Indian mystic. There are articles based on the teachings of Ramakrishna, as well as a section on book reviews of books on similar topics. The stated aim of the magazine is to promote a spiritual and matured outlook towards life. It advocates renunciation of selfish desires, along with the service to others in a spirit of worship-fulness.

Most articles published in the Vedanta Kesari are originally written for the magazine, though a few transcriptions of the lectures and speeches are also published.

Many scholars have contributed to Vedanta Kesari over time. Its contributors include John Woodroffe, Mahatma Gandhi, Sarojini Naidu, C. Rajagopalachari, T.L. Vaswani, K.M. Munshi, Karan Singh, Dalai Lama and A.P.J. Abdul Kalam. Many monks of the Ramakrishna Order also contribute to the magazine.

Since 1978, the magazine has been regularly bringing out an annual issue centred on a particular theme. Some of its popular theme-based issues published so far are: Yoga and its Aspects, Values for the Present Age, Globalization, Religion Today, Culture and Civilization, Channeling Youth Power, Nurturing Inter - personal Relationship, Upanishads in Daily Life, among others. Many of these numbers have later been made into books and published by the Ramakrishna Math.

Some of the well-known books published from the Math were originally serialized in the Vedanta Kesari. Among such are included such popular volumes such as Upanishad Series (Sanskrit, with English translation by Swami Sharvananda), Sri Ramakrishna, the Great Master (by Swami Saradananda), Bhakti Schools of Vedanta (by Swami Tapasyananda), and so on.

Editors
From May 1914 to April 1928, the magazine had no official editor. The April 1926 issue stated: 
"Swami Sharvananda who has been the President of the Ramakrishna Math and Mission in Madras since 1911 and has been editing the Vedanta Kesari from its very start is retiring from work after nineteen years of strenuous labour. He means to lead at present a life of perfect solitude and retirement.

"Swami Yatiswarananda who has been in charge of the Ramakrishna Ashrama in Bombay for nearly the last two years has come over to take charge of the Math and Mission in Madras. He has spent eight years of his monastic life in South India and has an intimate knowledge of several of its parts. He is the late editor of the Prabuddha Bharata and is well known for his scholarship and literary abilities. He was also intimately connected with the editorial work and the publication of the Vedanta Kesari'' for a long period. Our Journal will appear under his editorship from May next. All official correspondence must hereafter be addressed to him. We pray to the Lord to crown his work with complete success.'

1928 May onwards, The Vedanta Kesari started printing the names of the editors. It would mention both the names (president of Madras Math and the actual editor) as 'Editors'. September 1993 onwards, nomenclature was changed over to 'Managing Editor & Editor'

See also
Prabuddha Bharata

External links
 Sri Ramakrishna Math, Chennai Website
 The Vedanta Kesari magazine subscription page
 View and Download Vedanta Kesari issues
 96 Years of Vedanta Kesari Issues on DVD
  Several Editorials of Vedanta Kesari by Swami Paratparananda, a former Editor

Ramakrishna Mission
Magazines established in 1895
Hindu magazines
1895 establishments in India
Swami Vivekananda
Magazines about spirituality
Cultural magazines
Monthly magazines published in India
Mass media in Chennai
English-language magazines published in India